Luis Daniel Arroyo Cabrera (born July 17, 1991 in Bolivia) is a Bolivian  footballer who since 2012 has played midfielder for Blooming.

Club career statistics

References

External links
 
 

1991 births
Living people
Association football midfielders
Bolivian footballers
Universitario de Sucre footballers
Club Blooming players